Cresencio "Dondon" Ampalayo (born April 18, 1963 in Cebu City, Philippines) is a Filipino retired professional basketball player in the Philippine Basketball Association.

Basketball career
Dubbed as the 'Magician' or the 'Magic Man' in the PBA, Ampalayo won Rookie of the Year honors in 1986 while suiting up for  Ginebra San Miguel. Before turning pro, Ampalayo saw action for ESQ Merchants in the PABL.

  
Known for his pivot moves underneath the basket as well as adept three-point shooting, Dondon won three championships in eight seasons with Ginebra from 1986 to 1993. A mid-season trade in 1993 saw Ampalayo's transfer to the Alaska Milkmen in exchange for Bobby Jose. He played two more seasons with Alaska before persistent knee problems finally took its toll on him and cut short his career.

Personal life
Dondon is now living in the United States with his wife Anne Pasco Ampalayo, and sons Aldreen and Zachary.

References

External links
basketbolnatin-pbaawards.blogspot.com

1963 births
Living people
Alaska Aces (PBA) players
Barangay Ginebra San Miguel players
Basketball players from Cebu
Cebuano people
Filipino men's basketball players
Philippine Basketball Association All-Stars
Power forwards (basketball)
Sportspeople from Cebu City
USJ-R Jaguars basketball players
Barangay Ginebra San Miguel draft picks